Banara brasiliensis is a species of plant in the Salicaceae family. It is endemic to Brazil.

References

Flora of Brazil
brasiliensis
Vulnerable plants
Taxonomy articles created by Polbot